This article is a list of Royal Norwegian Navy fleet units and vessels, both past and present.

Ships from the years 1509 to 1814 might be listed under Royal Dano-Norwegian Navy.

Fleet units and vessels (present)

Frigates 

 
 
 
 
 <ref>Norwegian Defence Force official websites notes last of class commissioned January 2011:]  </ref>

 Support vessels 
  (former landing vessel)
  (former landing vessel)

 Royal yacht 
  (A553) (formerly Philante, a private yacht of British ownership; escort vessel during WWII)
 K/B Stjernen royal boat.

 Minesweepers

  (1994)
 Oksøy M340
 Karmøy M341
 Måløy M342
 Hinnøy M343
  (1996)
 Alta M350
 Otra  M351
 Rauma M352
 Orkla M353 (Ship sunk due to fire on 19 November 2002)
 Glomma M354
 Mine Clearance Command (divers)

 Submarine branch 

The submarine fleet consists of several s.

 1st Submarine Squadron (Diesel-electric Ula-class submarines):
 Ula (S300)
 Utsira (S301)
 Utstein (S302)
 Utvær (S303)
 Uthaug (S304)
 Uredd (S305)

 MTB branch 
[[File:Norwegian missile patrol craft KNM Skjold (P 690) (2 Nov 2001).jpg|thumb|right| missile patrol boat HNoMS Skjold]
The Coastal Warfare fleet consists of six  missile patrol boats. The boat type is often branded a corvette.

 Missile Torpedo Boat Command
 Missile Patrol Boat (Skjold class):
 Skjold (P960)
 Storm (P961)
 Skudd (P962)
 Steil (P963)
 Glimt (P964)
 Gnist (P965)
 Support vessel:

Naval Ranger branch 

 Norwegian Naval Special Operations Commando (Naval Ranger Command)
 Coastal Ranger Command
 Norwegian Mine Diver Command
 Tactical Boat Squadron
 Combat Boat 90 (1996)
Trondenes
Skrolsvik
Kråkenes
Stangnes
Kjøkøy
Mørvika
Kopås
Tangen
Oddane
Malmøya
Hysnes
Brettingen
Løkhaug
Søviknes
Hellen
Osternes
Fjell
Lerøy
Torås
Møvik

Logistics branch 
In the process of establishing a "logistics on keel" system.

Coast Guard units and vessels

 Coast Guard Squadron North
 
 
 
 
 
 
 
 
 
 
 
 
 
 
 
 Coast Guard Squadron South
 
 
 
 
 
 
 
 Future vessels
 Six vessels of the  ordered
 Three hybrid diesel-LNG vessels, two to be named  and Sortland and one unnamed ordered

Naval schools 

 Royal Norwegian Naval Basic Training Establishment, HNoMS Harald Haarfagre, Stavanger
 Royal Norwegian Navy Officer Candidate School, Horten
 Royal Norwegian Naval Academy, Laksevåg, Bergen
 Royal Norwegian Naval Training Establishment, HNoMS Tordenskjold, Haakonsvern, Bergen

Navy vessels (past) 
Several earlier ships are listed under Denmark.

Amphibious landing vessels
 
 Kvalsund (1968–1991)
 Raftsund
 
 Reinøysund Still in use or in reserve?
 Rotsund Still in use or in reserve?
 Borgsund
 Sørøysund (L4503) (Later rebuilt to Tjeldsund class)
 Maursund (L4504) (Later rebuilt to Tjeldsund class)
 
 Tjeldsund (L4506)

Armed auxiliaries

 Alpha (1904–1940?) patrol boat
 Alversund (1926–1940) patrol boat, sunk by own crew.
 Andenes (?–1940?) patrol boat
 Aud I (?–1940?) patrol boat
 Bergholm used as MCM vessel and Shetland Bus.
 Beta (1900–1940?) patrol boat
 Bjerk (1912–?) patrol boat
 Blink (1896–1940?) patrol boat
 Blåsel patrol boat
 Bodø Sunk by a mine in 1943
 Commonwealth (1912–1940?) patrol boat
 Honningsvåg, naval trawler, originally the German trawler Malangen, captured by Norwegian forces at Honningsvåg 13 April 1940
 Pol III, armed whaler; engaged German Kampfgruppe 5 on 8 April 1940, its captain, Leif Welding-Olsen, became the first Norwegian uniformed casualty of WWII
 , patrol boat

Brigs
  (1807/1825–1825)
  (1808/1814–1837)
  (1817–1854)
  (1814–1821)
  (1809/1814–1817)
  (1808/1814–1827)
  (1818–1847)
  (1805/1814–1882)
  (1808/1814–1820)
  (1808/1814–1817) Launched 1805. Captured from the Royal Navy off Lindesnes 19 June 1808.
  (1859–1900)

Coastal defence ships

 
  (1897–1948)
  (1897–1948)
 
  (1901–1940) – Sunk at Narvik on 9 April 1940.
  (1900–1940) – Sunk at Narvik on 9 April 1940.
 
  (1912) – Seized by the Royal Navy and renamed , blew up in September 1918.
  (1912) – Seized by the Royal Navy and renamed .

Corvettes
  (1849–1866)
  (1882–1925)
  (1844–1858)
  (1864–1940/1945)
  (1855–1903)
  (1851–1903)
  (1829–1874)
  (1849–1866)
  – Six vessels received from the Royal Navy
  – ex-
  – ex-
  – ex-
  (1942–1944)- ex-
  – ex-
 Polarfront II – ex-, used as a weather ship.
  – One vessel received from the Royal Navy
  – ex-, was sunk by a mine near Båtsfjord, Norway on 12 December 1944.
  – Two vessels built.
  (1965–1992)
  (1967–1992)

Destroyers

 
  (1910–1943) In Norwegian service until scrapped in 1944.
  (1912–1949) In German hands from 1940 to 1945, scrapped in 1949.
  (1914–1940) Sunk by Luftwaffe bombers on 26 April 1940 during the Norwegian campaign.

  Six vessels made in Norway from 1936 to 1939.
  (1936–1959) In Norwegian service during the war. Rebuilt to frigate in 1948.
  (1938–1959) In German hands from 1940 to 1945. Rebuilt to frigate in 1948.
  (1936–1940) Sunk by German bombers on 9 April 1940, at the beginning of Operation Weserübung after first sinking the German supply ship Roda and shooting down two Luftwaffe bombers.
  (1939–1959) In German hands from 1940 to 1945. Rebuilt to frigate in 1948.
  (1946–1959) In German hands from 1940 to 1945. Rebuilt to frigate in 1948.
  (1946–1959) In German hands from 1940 to 1945. Rebuilt to frigate in 1948.
 S class Two vessels on loan from the Royal Navy
  (1944) ex- Torpedoed and sunk on D-Day, 6 June 1944)
  (1943–1959) ex-

  Five vessels on loan from the Royal Navy.
 Lincoln (1942–1944)
 St Albans (1941–1944)
 Mansfield (1940–1942)
 Bath (1941)
 Newport (1941–1942)
  Four vessels bought from the UK in 1946 and 1947.
  (1947–1965) ex-
  ex-
  ex-
  ex-
 Type II 
 Arendal ex-
  ex-
  ex-
 Type III Hunt class
  (1942–1961), Later renamed Narvik
  (1942–1943)

Frigates

  (1828–1870)
  (1854–1920)
  (1860–1925)
  (1864–1932)
  Five vessels built.
  (1966–1994) Sank in 1994.
  (1967–2005)
  (1966–2006), used as target during missile test 2013
  (1967–1998)
  (1966–2007) transferred to the Royal Norwegian Navy Museum.
  Formerly of the Royal Canadian Navy
  (1956–1964) ex-
  (1956–1977) ex-, rebuilt in 1965 to serve as support vessel for torpedo boats under the name .
  (1956–1973) ex-, rebuilt in 1965 to serve as support vessel for submarines under the name HNoMS Horten.

Cutters
 Built at Trondhjems Skibsverft, Trondheim
 Capitaine Hans Peter Holm (1813/1814–1831)
 General von Krogh (1813/1814–1831)
Captured from Sweden
 Gripen (1813/1814–1815)

Schooners
 Built at Georgernes Verft, Bergen
 Thor (1805–1810)
 Balder (1805–1810)
 Odin (1808/1814–1839)
 Valkyrjen (1808/1814–1839)
 Nornen (1810/1814–1839)
 Hother (1810/1814–1839)
 Thor (1811/1814–1839)
 Balder (1811/1814–1839)
 Built at Trondhjems Skibsverft, Trondheim
 Patrioten Georg (1808/1814–?)
 Trondhjem (1808/1814–?)
 Borgersamfundet (1808/1814–?)
 Axel Thorsen (1810/1814–1863)
 Skjøn Valborg (1810/1814–1863)
"Bombgun schooners"
 Sleipner (1840–1866)
 Vale (1843–1866)
 Uller (1845–1877)
Steam powered schooners
 Gyller (1848–1905)
 Gler (1850–1905)
 Alfen (1859–1903) Rerigged and rebuilt as corvette in 1877.
Paddlesteam schooners
 Nordcap (1840–1870)
 Æger (1852–1891)
 Vidar (1855–1872)

Sloops
Sloops, several of which were later rebuilt as 3.-class gunboats.
 Arendal launched between 1840 and 1845. Rebuilt 1875.
 Augvaldsnæs launched between 1840 and 1845.
 Bergen launched between 1840 and 1845.
 Bodøe launched between 1840 and 1845.
 Bragernæs launched between 1840 and 1845.
 Brevig launched between 1840 and 1845. Rebuilt 1875, then used as a minelayer.
 Christiansund launched between 1840 and 1845.
 Drøbak launched between 1840 and 1845. Rebuilt 1872 to a catamaran steam gunboat and renamed Trold.
 Egersund launched between 1840 and 1845.
 Farsund launched between 1840 and 1845.
 Flekkefjord launched between 1840 and 1845.
 Fredrikshald launched between 1840 and 1845.
 Hammerfest launched between 1840 and 1845.
 Holmestrand launched between 1840 and 1845.
 Horten launched between 1840 and 1845. Rebuilt 1875 and used as a minelayer.
 Høievarde launched between 1840 and 1845.
 Kaholmen launched between 1840 and 1845.
 Karmøe launched between 1840 and 1845. Rebuilt 1883 and used as a minelayer.
 Kongsberg launched between 1840 and 1845. Rebuilt 1875. Stricken 1905.
 Kristiansand aka. Christiansand launched between 1840 and 1845. Rebuilt 1875 and used as a minelayer.
 Langesund launched between 1840 and 1845. Rebuilt 1875. Stricken 1905.
 Larvik aka. Laurvig launched between 1840 and 1845. Rebuilt 1875.
 Levanger launched between 1840 and 1845.
 Lillesand launched between 1840 and 1845. Rebuilt 1875 and used as a minelayer.
 Lindesnæs launched between 1840 and 1845.
 Molde launched between 1840 and 1845.
 Moss launched between 1840 and 1845.
 Munkholmen launched between 1840 and 1845.
 Namsos launched between 1840 and 1845.
 Porsgrund launched between 1840 and 1845. Rebuilt 1875. Stricken 1905.
 Sarpsborg launched between 1840 and 1845. Rebuilt 1872 as a catamaran steam gunboat and renamed Trold. Stricken 1905.
 Skeen launched between 1840 and 1845. Rebuilt 1875. Stricken 1905.
 Skudenæs launched between 1840 and 1845. Rebuilt 1883. Stricken 1905.
 Soon launched between 1840 and 1845.
 Stat launched between 1840 and 1845.
 Strømsøe launched between 1840 and 1845. Rebuilt 1872 as a catamaran steam gunboat and renamed Nøk. Stricken 1903.
 Svelvigen launched between 1840 and 1845. Rebuilt 1872 as a steam gunboat and renamed Dverg. Stricken 1905.
 Sverresborg launched between 1840 and 1845.
 Tananger launched between 1840 and 1845.
 Tangen launched between 1840 and 1845.
 Tromsøe launched between 1840 and 1845.
 Trondhjem launched between 1840 and 1845.
 Tønsberg launched between 1840 and 1845. Rebuilt 1875. Stricken 1905.
 Udsire launched between 1840 and 1845.
 Vardøe launched between 1840 and 1845.
 Vardøhuus launched between 1840 and 1845.
 Aalesund launched between 1840 and 1845.
 Aaasgaardstrand launched between 1840 and 1845. Rebuilt 1875 and used as a minelayer.

Gunboats

 
 Ellida (1882–1925)
 Sleipner (1878–1935)
 Viking (1892–1924)
 Frithjof (1895–1929)

 
 
 Vale (1874–1947) Rebuilt to minelayer in 1911.
 Brage (1878–1946) Rebuilt to minelayer in 1912.
 Nor (1878–1949) Rebuilt to minelayer in 1912.
 Uller (1876–1940) Rebuilt to minelayer in 1911.
 Vidar (1882–1947) Rebuilt to minelayer in 1911.
 
 Gor (1884–1945) Rebuilt to minelayer in 1913.
 Tyr (1887–1945) Rebuilt to minelayer in 1913.
 Æger (1894–1932)

Steam powered gunboats
 Rjukan (1861–1893)
 Sarpen (1861–1940)
 Lougen (1864–1903)
 Glommen (1864–1903)

Submarine chasers

 Hessa (P358)
 Hitra (museum vessel)
 Vigra (P359)
 King Haakon VII (1942–1951) Former US submarine chaser HNoMS King Haakon VIIUSS PC-467.

Submarines
 Kobben (1909–1933) Renamed A-1 on 21 February 1913. The tower of Kobben is preserved at the Royal Navy Officers' Training School at Horten.
 A class Three vessels were bought in 1913, a fourth was ordered in 1914 (A-5) but was confiscated by the Imperial German Navy at the outbreak of World War I.
 A-2 (1914–1940)
 A-3 (1914–1940)
 A-4 (1914–1940)
 A-5 Confiscated by Germany, named UA in 1914 and never entered Norwegian service.

 B class Six vessels of the US Holland type built on licence in Norway from 1922 to 1929.
 B-1 (1923–1947) Escaped to the Faeroe Islands 8 June 1940, later used as a training vessel in Scotland.
 B-2 (1924–1940) Captured by the Germans on 11 April.
 B-3 (1926–1940) Scuttled by own crew on 10 April to prevent German capture.
 B-4 (1927–1940) Captured by the Germans on 10 April.
 B-5 (1929–1940) Captured by the Germans on 11 April and renamed UC-1.
 B-6 (1930–1940) Surrendered to German troops on 18 April under threat of bombing of Florø city. Named UC −2 in German service.
 U class
 Uredd ex. HMS P41, (1941–1943)
 Ula ex. HMS Varne, (1943–1965), Given to Norway by the UK in 1943
 V class
 Utstein, ex. HMS Venturer, sold to Norway in 1946.
 Uthaug, ex. HMS Votary, sold to Norway in 1946.
 Utvær, ex. HMS Viking, sold to Norway in 1946.
 Utsira, ex. HMS Variance
 K class
 Kya, ex-U-926
 Kaura, ex-U-995
 Kinn, ex-U-1202
 Kobben class Fifteen vessels built from 1964 to 1967.
 Kinn (1964–1982) Deliberately sunk in Bjørnefjorden in 1990.
 Kya (1964–1991) Transferred to the Royal Danish Navy as HDMS Springeren in 1991.
 Kobben (1964–2001) Transferred to the Polish Navy as ORP Jastrząb to be used for parts.
 Kunna (1964–?) Transferred to Poland as ORP Kondor in 2004.
 Kaura (1965–?) Transferred to Denmark to be used for parts in 1991.
 Ula (1965–1998) Changed name to Kinn in 1987. Scrapped in 1998.
 Utsira (1965–1998) Scrapped 1998.
 Utstein (1965–1998) Transferred to the Royal Norwegian Navy Museum in 1998.
 Utvær (1965–1989) Transferred to Denmark as HDMS Tumleren in 1989.
 Uthaug (1966–1990) Transferred to Denmark as HDMS Sælen in 1990.
 Sklinna (1966–2001) Scrapped in 2001.
 Skolpen (1966–2002) Transferred to Poland as ORP Sęp in 2002.
 Stadt (1966–1990) Scrapped.
 Stord (1967–2002) Transferred to Poland as ORP Sokół in 2002.
 Svenner (1967–2003) Also a training ship. To Poland as ORP Bielik in 2003.
 Ula class Six vessels were delivered from Germany in 1989-1992 and still active.
 Ula (S300) (since 1988)
 Utsira (S301) (since 1992)
 Utstein (S302) (since 1991)
 Utvær (S303) (since 1990)
 Uthaug (S304) (since 1991)
 Uredd (S305) (since 1990)

Minesweepers

 Børtind (1912–?) Refitted guard vessel
 Otra First purpose built Norwegian minesweeper
 Rauma Second purpose built Norwegian minesweeper
 NYMS class
 NYMS 247/Vinstra (M 317)
 NYMS 306/Gaula (M 318)
 NYMS 377/Driva (M 319) 
 NYMS 379/Alta (M 320)
 NYMS 380/Vorma (M 321)
 NYMS 381/Begna (M 322)
 NYMS 382
 NYMS 406/Rana (M 330)
 Sauda class
 Kvina
 Ogna
 Sauda
 Sira
 Tana
 Tista
 Utla
 Vosso
 Glomma
  (museum vessel)
 Syrian
 Nordhav II
 Drøbak
Commissioned in the Royal Norwegian Navy 1995-2014.

Minelayers

Glommen class
Glommen (1916–1950)
Laugen (1918–1950)
 Frøya (1918–1940)
 Olav Tryggvason (1934–1940)
 Gor class Formerly US Navy Auk class.
 
 
 
 
 Vidar class Two vessels built in Norway.
 Vidar (N52) (1977–2006) Sold to the Lithuanian Naval Force in 2006.
 Vale (N53) (1978–2003) Given to the Latvian Navy in 2003.

Monitors

 Skorpionen class:
 Skorpionen  (1867–1908)
 Mjølner (1869–1908)
 Thrudvang  (1870–1918)
 Thor  (1876–1918)

Offshore patrol vessels
 Heimdal (1892–1946)
 Fridtjof Nansen (1930–1940)
 Nordkapp (1937–1954)

Torpedo boats
 Rap (1873–1920) – the first modern torpedo boat.
 Ulven (1878–1923)

 2. class – 27 built from 1882.
 Lyn
 Rask (1885–?)
 Pil (1886–?)
 Snar (1887–?)
 Orm (1888–?)
 Kjell (1912–1940) Captured by the Germans and used as a patrol boat under the name KT1, later rebuilt as a minesweeper under the name NK.02 Dragoner, sunk 28 September 1944 by British aircraft.

 1. class Ten vessels built from 1892.
 3. class One small harbour and fjord torpedo boat built in 1899.
 Myg (1899–?)
 Oter (1888–?)
 Raket (1894–?)
 Varg (1894–?)
 Glimt (1897–?)
 Djerv (1897–1940) Refitted as minesweeper. Sunk by own crew in Sognefjorden.
 Storm (1898–1940)
 Brand (1898–1946)
 Trods (1898–?)
 Dristig (1899–1940) Refitted as minesweeper. Sunk by own crew in Sognefjorden.
 Laks (1900–?)
 Sild (1900–?)
 Sæl (1901–1940)
 Skrei (1901–?)
 Hauk (1902–?)
 Falk (1902–?)
 Ørn (1903–?)
 Ravn (1903–?)
 Grib (1905–?)
 Jo (1905–?)
 Lom (1905–?)
 Skarv (1906–?)
 Teist (1907–?)
 Trygg class Three 256 ton vessels built between 1919 and 1921 
Trygg (1919–1940) Sunk, then salvaged by the Germans in 1940.
 Snøgg (1920–1940) Captured by the Germans in 1940.
 Stegg (1921–1940) Sunk in battle in 1940.
 MTB 5 (1940)
 MTB 6 (1940–1941)
 MTB 56 (1941–1942)
 MTB 345 (1943) Captured by the Germans 28 July 1943, lost in fire the next month
Fairmile D class aka D class. Ten vessels were in Norwegian service at the end of WWII. Seven of them were used until 1959.
Elco class Ten vessels received from the US Navy as part of a weapons aid program in 1951.
 Snøgg ex US Navy PT-602
 Sel ex US Navy PT-603
 Sild ex US Navy PT-604
 Skrei ex US Navy PT-605
 Snar ex US Navy PT-606
 Springer ex US Navy PT-608
 Hai ex US Navy PT-609
 Hauk ex US Navy PT-610
 Hval ex US Navy PT-611
 Hvass ex US Navy PT-612
 Tjeld class aka. Nasty class 20 vessels built in Norway from 1959 to 1966.
 Tjeld (1959–1992) Renamed Sel. Transferred to Naval Reserve and used by Sea Home Guard. Sold for scrapping 1992.
 Skarv (1959–1981) Sold to Stapletask Ltd, Sittingbourne, Kent, England.
 Teist (1960–1981) Sold to Stapletask Ltd, Sittingbourne, Kent, England.
 Jo (1960–1981) Sold to Stapletask Ltd, Sittingbourne, Kent, England.
 Lom (1961–1981) Sold to Stapletask Ltd, Sittingbourne, Kent, England.
 Stegg (1961–1992) Renamed Hval. Transferred to Naval Reserve and used by Naval Home Guard. Sold for scrapping 1992.
 Hauk (1961–1992) Renamed Laks. Transferred to Naval Reserve and used by Sea Home Guard. Sold for scrapping 1992.
 Falk (1961–1981) Sold to Stapletask Ltd, Sittingbourne, Kent, England.
 Ravn (1961–1992) Renamed Knurr. Transferred to Naval Reserve and used by Sea Home Guard. Sold for scrapping 1992.
 Gribb (1961–?) Renamed Delfin. Transferred to Naval Reserve and used by Sea Home Guard. Was planned to be preserved by Kværner Mandal A/S, but later sold for scrapping.
 Geir (1962–1981) Sold to Stapletask Ltd, Sittingbourne, Kent, England.
 Erle (1962–1981) Sold to Stapletask Ltd, Sittingbourne, Kent, England.
 Sel (1963–1981) Sold to Stapletask Ltd, Sittingbourne, Kent, England.
 Hval (1964–1981) Sold to Stapletask Ltd, Sittingbourne, Kent, England.
 Laks (1964–1981) Sold to Stapletask Ltd, Sittingbourne, Kent, England.
 Hai (1964–?) Transferred to Naval Reserve and used by Sea Home Guard. Plans are currently underway for Hai to be preserved as a museum ship in Fredrikstad.
 Knurr (1964–1981) Sold to Stapletask Ltd, Sittingbourne, Kent, England.
 Lyr (1965–1992) Transferred to Naval Reserve and used by Sea Home Guard. Sold for scrapping 1992.
 Skrei (1965–?) Transferred to Naval Reserve and used by Sea Home Guard. Transferred to the Royan Norwegian Navy Museum and preserved as a museum ship.
 Delfin (1966–1984) Given to Friends of the Shetland bus as a preservation project, but the project failed and the ship was given to a private person.
 Rapp class Six vessels built in Norway from 1952 to 1956.
 Rapp
 Rask (?–1970)
 Storm class 20 vessels built from 1965 to 1967.
 Arg
 Blink
 Brann
 Brask
 Brott
 Djerv
 Glimt
 Gnist
 Hvass
 Kjekk
 Odd
 Pil
 Rokk
 Skjold
 Skudd
 Steil
 Storm
 Traust
 Tross
 Trygg
 Snøgg class Six vessels built from 1970 to 1971.

 Kjapp
 Kvikk (1970–1994)
 Rapp
 Snøgg (1970–1994)
 Rask
 Snar
 Hauk class
 Hauk (P986)
 Ørn (P987)
 Terne (P988)
 Teist (P991)
 Tjeld (P989)
 Lom (P993)
 Stegg (P994)
 Ravn (P996)
 Geir (P998)
 Skarv (P990)
 Jo (P992)
 Falk (P995)
 Gribb (P997)
 Erle (P999)

Training vessels, school ships
 Christian Radich
 Haakon VII (A537) (1958–1973) ex-USS Gardiners Bay (AVP-39). School ship. Built as a seaplane tender for the United States Navy.
 Sørlandet

Other ships
 Brabant
 Ormen Lange longship (Long Serpent)

References

Sources
Vold, Ottar; Felttoget 1940 – avdelingenes påkjenninger og tap; 1995; 
Axel Thorsen, a Norwegian gunboat of 1810 High resolution photos of a model

 
Ships
Navy Ships
Norway